Francine Antonietti (born 30 September 1946) is a Swiss sports shooter. She competed in two events at the 1988 Summer Olympics.

References

External links

1946 births
Living people
Swiss female sport shooters
Olympic shooters of Switzerland
Shooters at the 1988 Summer Olympics
Place of birth missing (living people)